Società Polisportiva Reno Centese Associazione Sportiva Dilettante is an Italian association football club from Reno Centese, frazione of Cento, Emilia-Romagna. It currently plays in Seconda Categoria Bologna - Girone G. Its colors are blue and light blue.

External links
 Official homepage

Football clubs in Italy
Association football clubs established in 1970
Football clubs in Emilia-Romagna
1970 establishments in Italy